Peppertown is an unincorporated community in Salt Creek Township, Franklin County, Indiana.

History
Peppertown was platted in 1859 by Fielding Berry. It is named for August Pepper, who settled on the site in 1851. August Pepper worked as a calico printer.

Geography

References

Unincorporated communities in Franklin County, Indiana
Unincorporated communities in Indiana